Whoopee! is a 1930 American pre-Code comedy musical western film directed by Thornton Freeland and starring Eddie Cantor, Ethel Shutta, and Eleanor Hunt. It was photographed in two-color Technicolor. Its plot closely follows the 1928 stage show produced by Florenz Ziegfeld.

Synopsis
In this zany musical, Sally loves Wanenis, a Native American man, but her father has forbidden her to marry him. Instead, she has been convinced to marry Sheriff Bob Wells. At the last minute, however, Sally decides she loves Wanenis too much and tricks farmhand Henry Williams into helping her run away to the ranch of Jerome Underwood. When Wells comes looking for Sally, it proves trouble for the oblivious Henry.

Cast

 Eddie Cantor as Henry Williams
 Ethel Shutta as Mary Custer
 Paul Gregory as Wanenis
 Eleanor Hunt as Sally Morgan
 Jack Rutherford as Sheriff Bob Wells
 Walter Law as Jud Morgan
 Spencer Charters as Jerome Underwood
 Albert Hackett as Chester Underwood
 Marian Marsh as Harriett Underwood

Production
The film was produced by Florenz Ziegfeld and Samuel Goldwyn, and directed by Thornton Freeland. Whoopee! made a movie star of Eddie Cantor, already one of the leading stars of Broadway revues and musical comedies, as well as being a popular recording artist in the United States. The song "My Baby Just Cares for Me" was written especially for Cantor to sing in the film and became a signature tune for him. George Olsen and his Music, already well-known Victor recording artists, repeated their work from the stage version. Other stars in the film were Eleanor Hunt, Ethel Shutta (George Olsen's wife), and Paul Gregory. Future stars Betty Grable, Paulette Goddard, Ann Sothern, Virginia Bruce, and Claire Dodd appeared uncredited as "Goldwyn Girls".

The film also launched the Hollywood career of Busby Berkeley. It was Alfred Newman's first composing job in Hollywood. Richard Day did the set designs and behind the camera was Gregg Toland, who later found fame with Orson Welles. H. Bruce "Lucky" Humberstone served in an uncredited role as assistant director.

Cultural references 
In 2012, the song "Makin' Whoopee" was featured in the Season 8 premiere of the American adult animated series American Dad!

Awards
The film was nominated for an Academy Award for Best Art Direction by Richard Day.

See also
 List of early color feature films

References

External links

 
 
 
 
Film still of Goldwyn Girl at WalterFilm.com

1930 films
1930s color films
1930 musical comedy films
1930 romantic comedy films
American musical comedy films
American romantic comedy films
American romantic musical films
American Western (genre) comedy films
1930 Western (genre) films
American films based on plays
Films based on musicals
Films directed by Thornton Freeland
Films scored by Alfred Newman
Films shot in California
Samuel Goldwyn Productions films
United Artists films
Early color films
1930s English-language films
1930s American films
Goldwyn Girls
American Western (genre) musical films
1930s Western (genre) comedy films
1930s Western (genre) musical films